Edward Terrance Kazak (July 18, 1920 – December 15, 1999) was a Major League Baseball third baseman who played for the St. Louis Cardinals and Cincinnati Reds from 1948 to 1952. Born Edward Terrance Tkaczuk, he graduated from Cecil Township High School in 1938, where he played both baseball and soccer. He played sandlot baseball and played in the Georgia–Florida League for a few years, boasting a batting average of .378 in 1941 when with Albany, the team that won the Georgia-Florida pennant.

After the end of the 1942 season on October 1, Kazak entered the military and enlisted with the United States Army. He was originally stationed in Brooks Field, Texas, then joined the paratroopers in 1943. In 1944, Kazak left the United States for Europe. After the Invasion of Normandy, Kazak sustained a bayonet wound to his left arm and had his right elbow shattered by shrapnel. As a result, he spent 18 months in hospitals recovering and enduring numerous operations, including one where a plastic patch was put in place of the missing bone in his elbow. By the time he was released in December 1945, his doctors has told him to forget about baseball.

In 1946, Kazak spent the season in the South Atlantic League, playing for the Columbus Cardinals. In 1947, he played for the Omaha Cardinals of the Western League and the Rochester Red Wings of the International League. Though he has been a second baseman throughout his career, he moved to third base while playing for Rochester in 1948. By the end of the season, Kazak was promoted to the major leagues.

Kazak made his major league debut on September 29, 1948, and played in six games with 22 at bats during the 1948 season. The 1949 season was Kazak's best statistical season. In 92 games, he had a career-high batting average of .304, 6 home runs, 3 triples, and made his only All-Star appearance. In the 1949 Major League Baseball All-Star Game, Kazak was the starting third baseman, and had two hits in two at-bats. However, Kazak was later injured and lost his starting job to Tommy Glaviano, becoming a pinch hitter during the 1950 season. He had 207 at-bats in 93 games during the 1950 season, and led the National League with 42 pinch hit at-bats. Kazak only played 11 games the following season, and after playing three games in 1952, he was traded along with Wally Westlake from the Cardinals to the Reds for Dick Sisler and Virgil Stallcup on May 13, 1952. However, Kazak only had one hit in 13 games as a member of the Reds, which marked the end of his Major League career.

Kazak continued to play baseball after his major league career was over. He played his last professional game at the age of 40 in 1960 while playing for Austin in the Texas League. He died in Austin, Texas on December 15, 1999.

References

External links

Eddie Kazak at Baseball Almanac

1920 births
1999 deaths
Major League Baseball third basemen
Baseball players from Ohio
St. Louis Cardinals players
Cincinnati Reds players
San Diego Padres (minor league) players
Sportspeople from Steubenville, Ohio
Valdosta Trojans players
United States Army personnel of World War II
Omaha Cardinals players
Rochester Red Wings players
Sacramento Solons players
Austin Senators players
Seattle Rainiers players
Beaumont Exporters players
Miami Marlins (IL) players
Albany Cardinals players
Houston Buffaloes players
Columbus Cardinals players
United States Army soldiers